The 1981 Avon Championships of Chicago  was a women's tennis tournament played on indoor carpet courts at the International Amphitheatre  in Chicago, Illinois in the United States that was part of the 1981 Avon Championships Circuit. It was the 10th edition of the tournament and was held from January 26 through February 1, 1981. First-seeded Martina Navratilova won the singles title and earned $35,000 first-prize money.

Finals

Singles
 Martina Navratilova defeated  Hana Mandlíková 6–4, 6–2
 It was Navratilova's 2nd singles title of the year and the 47th of her career.

Doubles
 Martina Navratilova /  Pam Shriver defeated  Barbara Potter /  Sharon Walsh 6–3, 6–1

Prize money

References

External links
 International Tennis Federation (ITF) tournament edition details
 Tournament draws

Avon Championships of Chicago
Avon Championships of Chicago
1981 in sports in Illinois
Avon